The 1857 British general election in Ireland produced a victory in Ireland for the Whigs under Lord Palmerston. The election was the first to be contested by the Independent Irish Party under their own banner. The Independent Irish Party had been formed following the 1852 election by Liberal candidates who had pledged to form an independent party in parliament should they be elected. A total of 48 Liberal candidates made the pledge.

Results

University Constituencies

See also
 History of Ireland (1801–1923)

References

1859
General election
Ireland
April 1857 events
May 1857 events
1850s elections in Ireland